UAE Drones for Good is an annual international competition and award by the government of the United Arab Emirates to encourage useful and positive applications for drone technology. It offers a $1 million award for the international competition and UAE Dhs1 million award for the UAE competition.

The award was launched at the UAE Government Summit 2014. The first 2015 award was contested by more than 800 entries from 57 countries including MIT's 'Waterfly' collaborative drone 'swarms'. The finalists included Spanish company CATUAV for a drone fitted with optical sensors to scan war-affected regions of Bosnia and Herzegovina for landmines buried during the 1990s. The eventual winner was Swiss group Flyability with a search and rescue Gimball drone. The 2016 competition awarded Loon Copter's sea-hybrid UAV in February 2017.

References 

Unmanned aerial vehicles of the United Arab Emirates
Emirati science and technology awards
Engineering competitions